Cefnethin Rugby Football Club (Welsh: Clwb Rygbi Cefneithin) is a Welsh rugby union team from Cefneithin, Ammanford, officially founded in 1929. Cefnethin RFC is a member of the Welsh Rugby Union and is a feeder club for the Llanelli Scarlets. The club fields a first, seconds and youth team.

Club honours
 2008/09 WRU Division Five West - Champions
 2018/19 WRU 3b West Central - Champions

Notable former players

  Carwyn James (2 caps)
  Barry John
  William John Jones (1 cap)

References

Welsh rugby union teams
Sport in Carmarthenshire